Miske is a village in Bács-Kiskun county in southern Hungary.

Miske may also refer to the following articles:

People
Ahmed Baba Miské, Mauritanian writer, diplomat and politician
Billy Miske (1894–1924), American professional boxer
Georg Miske (1928–2009), German Olympic Weightlifter

Other uses
Miske (drink), an Ecuadorean alcoholic beverage